Chung Ho Yin (born 15 April 1971, in  Hong Kong) is a former Hong Kong professional footballer.

Club career
He made his debut in first level game in Lai Sun's FA Cup match against Sing Tao on 6 April 1990.

He was released by South China of Hong Kong First Division League after 2006–07 season. However, he resigned a contract with the club after the start of 2007–08 season. He then was loaned to Eastern for the first half of the season and played 5 matches for the team. In 2008–09 season he go back to Eastern as a contract player.

International career
He has capped for Hong Kong at various youth levels, the Olympic team and was a season international.  He also played in the 1992 FIFA Futsal World Championship, helping Hong Kong to finish 10th while beating Nigeria 4–1 in the process.

Career statistics
As of 14 May 2008

References

External links
 Player Information on Scaafc.com 
 Player Information on HKFA.com

1971 births
Living people
Hong Kong footballers
Hong Kong international footballers
Association football goalkeepers
Hong Kong First Division League players
South China AA players
Eastern Sports Club footballers
Hong Kong Rangers FC players
Kitchee SC players
Double Flower FA players
Footballers at the 1994 Asian Games
Footballers at the 1998 Asian Games
Asian Games competitors for Hong Kong